Kota Futaki (二木 康太, born August 1, 1995) is a Japanese professional baseball pitcher for the Chiba Lotte Marines in Japan's Nippon Professional Baseball.

External links

NBP

1995 births
Living people
Japanese baseball players
Chiba Lotte Marines players
Baseball people from Kagoshima Prefecture